Santianes de Molenes is one of 28 parishes (administrative divisions) in the municipality of Grado, within the province and autonomous community of Asturias, in northern Spain. 

The population is 154 (INE 2007).

Villages and hamlets include:  Bárzana, La Formiguera, Fuécara, Llamas, El Llanón, Momalo, San Miguel, Santianes de Molenes, Tejedo (Teixéu en asturiano), Vega de Villaldín, and Villaldín.

References

Parishes in Grado